Iles Purpuraires are a set of small islands off the western coast of Morocco at the bay located at Essaouira, the largest of which is Mogador Island. These islands were settled in antiquity by the Phoenicians, chiefly to exploit certain marine resources and as a promontory fort. (Hogan, 2007)  Roman occupation of western Morocco beginning in the 1st century AD continued the use of the islets, principally for manufacture of a royal blue dye from certain marine organisms.  Neolithic archaeological studies in this area indicate indigenous peoples of western Morocco fished in this locale circa 3000 to 2000 BC. (Trakadas, 2002) The islands have been designated as a protected Ramsar site since 2005.

References

 C.Michael Hogan, Mogador: promontory fort, The Megalithic Portal, ed. Andy Burnham, Nov. 2, 2007 
 Athena Tradakas, Ancient Marine Resource Exploitation in the Western Mediterranean: the Contribution of the fish salting industry of Mauretania Tingitana (Morocco), Institute of Classical Archaeology, Aarhus University, Denmark

Islands of Morocco
Islands of the North Atlantic Ocean
Geography of Marrakesh-Safi
Ramsar sites in Morocco